Jessica Collins (born Jessica Lynn Capogna; April 1, 1971) is an American actress. She is best known for portraying Dinah Lee Mayberry on the ABC soap opera Loving (1991–1994) and Avery Bailey Clark on the CBS soap opera The Young and the Restless (2011–2015), for which she won a Daytime Emmy. She also starred as Meredith Davies on Fox's Tru Calling, and appeared in recurring and guest roles in many other shows.

Early life
Collins was born in Schenectady, New York. She attended Amsterdam High School in Amsterdam, New York. In 1988, she won the title Miss New York Teen USA and was the first runner-up for the Miss Teen USA Pageant in that same year. Collins later attended London's Royal National Theatre Studio and the Howard Fine Acting Studio in Los Angeles.

Career
Collins starred in ABC daytime soap opera Loving as Dinah Lee Mayberry from 1991 to 1994. After leaving daytime, Collins appeared in the films Leprechaun 4: In Space (1996), Best of the Best: Without Warning (1998), and Beautiful (2000), and guest-starred in primetime shows such as Lois & Clark: The New Adventures of Superman, Star Trek: Voyager, Beverly Hills 90210, and Dawson's Creek.

Collins played Meredith Davies on the Fox Network's Tru Calling from 2003 to 2004. She had a major recurring role in the NBC period drama, American Dreams, and later appeared in the short-lived series Unscripted and Scoundrels. She also starred in the short-lived ABC comedy-drama Big Shots from 2007 to 2008. In film, Collins played roles in Ritual (2002), Catch Me If You Can (2002), Dirty Love (2005), Live! (2007), and Open House (2010). Her other television credits include CSI: Crime Scene Investigation, Two and a Half Men, Nip/Tuck, It's Always Sunny in Philadelphia, and NCIS.

In 2011, Collins returned to soaps with a role as Avery Bailey Clark on CBS's The Young and the Restless. In 2013 and 2016, she was nominated for Daytime Emmy Award for Outstanding Supporting Actress in a Drama Series for her role, winning in 2016. In May 2015, Soap Opera Digest reported that Collins was leaving the show, with Avery's last appearance airing on July 21, 2015.

In February 2019, it was announced that Collins joined the cast of the episode entitled "Cracker Jack" of the upcoming Netflix anthology series Dolly Parton's Heartstrings.

Personal life
Collins married Robert Tyler, her co-star from Loving, on November 11, 1996. The couple divorced February 15, 2002, citing irreconcilable differences.

On May 4, 2016, she married writer and producer Michael Cooney. She and Cooney have a daughter, born in January 2016.

Filmography

Film

Television

Awards and nominations

References

External links

 
 
 Jessica Collins  at TV.com 

1971 births
American television actresses
American film actresses
20th-century Miss Teen USA delegates
Actors from Schenectady, New York
Living people
Actresses from New York (state)
American soap opera actresses
20th-century American actresses
21st-century American actresses
Daytime Emmy Award winners
Daytime Emmy Award for Outstanding Supporting Actress in a Drama Series winners